Mara Vladimirovna Kana   (birth name Marina Vladimirovna Nesterova; born November 25, 1978, Moscow) is a Russian rock singer, musician, and songwriter.

Biography
She was born on November 25, 1978, in Moscow.

Until 2000, she lived in Ivanteyevka, near Moscow, then moved to the capital. Graduated from music school, guitar class. She wrote her first song in 1989.

Studied at the Moscow University of Consumer Cooperatives.

In 2003, on the air of Nashe Radio, for the first time, Mara's song Airplanes  was heard, which subsequently was on the  Chart Dozen hit parade for several months. After it came the track  Dolphins. The song  Cold Men, for which a video clip was shot, brought the greatest popularity to the singer. In the same year, she performed at the Invasion festival and released her first album, Frankness.

Scandals
In 2004, at the Nashestvie rock festival, the singer exposed her breasts while performing the song Sex in front of a 70,000-strong crowd of spectators.

Since 2014 he has been performing a number of nationalist works in the sense of Blood and soil.

In 2022, she supported the Russian invasion of Ukraine.

Discography

Studio albums 
 2003 — Frankness
 2005 — 220V
 2012 — Two Worlds
 2015 — War and Peace
 2018 — Russian Star

Live albums 
 2008 — Unplugged
 2013 — Feel the Difference

References

External links
 Мара о бывшем муже и о гомофобии
 Мара и Рейхстаг
 Мара: Донбасс хочет в Россию больше, чем Крым

1978 births
Living people
21st-century Russian women singers
21st-century Russian singers
Musicians from Moscow
Russian pop singers
Russian rock singers
Russian women composers
Russian women singer-songwriters
Indie rock musicians